Mogollon may refer to:

Anthropology 

Mogollon culture (c. 200–1500 CE), a culture in what is now Northern Mexico and the Southwestern United States

Cryptozoology 

Mogollon Monster, a legendary creature that has been discussed in accounts from central and eastern Arizona along the Mogollon Rim

Geography 

Mogollón, Los Santos, Panama
Mogollon Baldy, one of the tallest peaks in the Mogollon Mountains in New Mexico
Mogollon Mountains or Mogollon Range, a mountain range in southwestern New Mexico
Mogollon, New Mexico, a ghost town located in the Mogollon Mountains in New Mexico
Mogollon Plateau, part of the Colorado plateau
Mogollon Rim, an escarpment in Arizona which is the southwestern edge of the Colorado Plateau

People 

Alfón Gil de Mogollón, late 14th-century/early 15th-century Spanish nobleman
Pedro Gil de Mogollón, 14th-century Spanish nobleman
Juan Ignacio Flores Mogollón, Spanish Governor of New Mexico from 1712 to 1715
Oscar Mogollon (1940–2009), education visionary of the late 20th century